Kecun Station is an interchange station between Lines 3 and 8 of the Guangzhou Metro. It started operations on 28 June 2003. It is located at the underground of Kecun Village in Haizhu District.

Before the extension to both lines 2 and 8 opened in September 2010, this station ran as part of Line 2 as a single line from Wanshengwei to Sanyuanli.

Station layout

References

Railway stations in China opened in 2003
Guangzhou Metro stations in Haizhu District